The 2010–11 Syracuse Orange men's basketball team represented Syracuse University in the 2010–11 NCAA Division I men's basketball season. The head coach was Jim Boeheim, serving for his 35th year. The team played its home games at the Carrier Dome in Syracuse, New York and are members of the Big East Conference. They finished the season 27–8, 12–6 in Big East play and lost in the semifinals of the 2011 Big East men's basketball tournament to Connecticut. They received an at-large bid in the 2011 NCAA Division I men's basketball tournament where they beat Indiana State in the second round before being upset in the third round by Marquette.

Due to NCAA sanctions, seven wins were vacated.

Preseason

Roster changes

Syracuse graduated two starters from the previous year's team, shooting guard Andy Rautins and center Arinze Onuaku.  In addition, junior forward Wes Johnson declared that he would enter the 2010 NBA draft.  He was selected fourth overall by the Minnesota Timberwolves.

Recruiting

Preseason outlook
In the USA TODAY/ESPN coaches preseason poll, Syracuse ranked #13 in the country.

In the AP preseason poll, writers voted Syracuse #10 in the country.

In the Big East preseason Coaches' Poll, Syracuse was predicted to finish third. The Orange received two first place votes. Fabricio de Melo was named Preseason Rookie of the Year.  Kris Joseph was named to the All-Big East second team and Rick Jackson received an honorable mention.

A preseason poll of writers in Big East cities conducted by the Syracuse Post-Standard predicted the Orange would finish third.  Two writers predicted Syracuse would finish first.  Kris Joseph was named to the pre-season All-Big East first team and received some preseason Player of the Year votes. Fabricio de Melo won the Rookie of the Year with nine votes while Dion Waiters received two votes.

Roster

Depth chart

Season
Syracuse went 26-7 on the year and lost to Connecticut 76-71 (OT) in the semifinals of the Big East Conference tournament. They earned a #3 seed in the NCAA tournament and will face Indiana State in the second round.

Syracuse loses to Marquette by thrilling shots and sadly after Jackson finished his career in Syracuse.

Schedule

|-
!colspan=12 style=| Exhibition

|-
!colspan=12 style=| Regular season

|-
!colspan=12 style=| Big East regular season

|-
!colspan=12 style=| Big East tournament

|-
!colspan=12 style=| NCAA tournament

Rankings

2011 signing class

References

Syracuse Orange
Syracuse Orange men's basketball seasons
Syracuse Orange
Syracuse Orange men's basketball team
Syracuse Orange men's basketball team